A list of films produced by the Marathi language film industry based in Maharashtra in the year 1954.

1954 Releases
A list of Marathi films released in 1954.

References

Lists of 1954 films by country or language
 Marathi
1954